Maternal Admiration is an oil painting by the French artist William-Adolphe Bouguereau, painted in 1869, and now owned by a private collector. Its dimensions are 116 × 89 cm.

References

1869 paintings
Paintings by William-Adolphe Bouguereau
Children in art
Women in art
Allegorical paintings by French artists
19th-century allegorical paintings
Private art collections